Agastoschizomus is a genus of protoschizomid short-tailed whipscorpions, first described by Jon Mark Rowland in 1971.

Species 
, the World Schizomida Catalog accepts the following eight species:

 Agastoschizomus huitzmolotitlensis Rowland, 1975 – Mexico
 Agastoschizomus juxtlahuacensis Moreno & Francke, 2009 – Mexico
 Agastoschizomus lucifer Rowland, 1971 – Mexico
 Agastoschizomus patei Cokendolpher & Reddell, 1992 – Mexico
 Agastoschizomus stygius Cokendolpher & Reddell, 1992 – Mexico
 Agastoschizomus tamaulipensis Monjaraz-Ruedas, Francke & Cokendolpher, 2016 – Mexico
 Agastoschizomus tenebris Monjaraz-Ruedas, Francke & Cokendolpher, 2016 – Mexico
 Agastoschizomus texanus Monjaraz-Ruedas, Francke & Cokendolpher, 2016 – US (Texas)

References 

Schizomida genera